The northern sword-nosed bat (Lonchorhina inusitata) is a bat species found in Brazil, French Guiana, Suriname and Venezuela.

References

Lonchorhina
Bats of South America
Bats of Brazil
Mammals of French Guiana
Mammals of Suriname
Mammals of Venezuela
Mammals described in 1997